Shannan may refer to:

Geographical regions
Shannan, Tibet, prefecture-level city of the Tibet Autonomous Region, China
Shaannan, or Southern Shaanxi, the southern part of Shaanxi province, China
Shannan Circuit, a province of Tang Dynasty China, later divided into:

People
Shannan Click (born 1983), an American model
Shannan McPherson (born 1985) rugby league footballer
Shannan Ponton (born 1975), personal trainer on the Australian version of The Biggest Loser

See also
 
 Shannon (disambiguation)
 Nanshan (disambiguation), referring to "", with the characters reversed